This is a list of Italian television related events from 1995.

Events

 23 February. During the Sanremo Festival, the unemployed Pino Pagano threatens, on air, to jump from a dais of the Ariston theatre. The presenter Pippo Baudo eventually manages to get him down, among the applauses of the public. Later, Pagano will admit to have staged the suicide, hoping to get some notoriety. The contest is won by Giorgia, with Come saprei.

Debuts

Rai

Serial 

 Pazza famiglia (Crazy family)  – with Enrico Montesano (also director), Alessandra Casella and Paolo Panelli ; 2 seasons. The family troubles of an aged architect, forced to face his second divorce, are told in humorous key.

News and educational 

 Le Alpi di Messner (Reinhold Messner’s Alps) – by Carlo Alberto Pinelli; 2 seasons.

Fininvest

Variety 

 Colpo di fulmine (Love at first sight) – reality show, hosted by Alessia Marcuzzi, Michelle Hunziker  and Walter Nudo, Italian version of the American Street match; four seasons. The host tries to match a boy and a girl chosen by chance in the streets of a town.

International
3 July - // The Busy World of Richard Scarry (Rai 1) (1994-1997)
1 October -  Skeleton Warriors (Italia 1) (1995)
10 October -  Gravedale High (Italia 1) (1990)
24 December -  Noddy's Toyland Adventures (Italia 1) (1992-1994, 1999)
/ Fievel's American Tails (TELE+1) (1992)
/ Eek! The Cat (Italia 1) (1992-1997)
 The Adventures of Blinky Bill (Junior TV) (1994)

Television shows

RAI

Drama 

 Moses – by Roger Young, with Ben Kingsley in the title role, Frank Langella (Merneptha) and Christopher Lee (Ramses II.); fifth chapter of the LuX Vide's Bible project.
La rossa del Roxy Bar (The Roxy bar’s red woman) – comedy with Tullio Solenghi and Anna Marchesini (also directors); 2 episodes. Two bored spouses become, under fake identities, lovers of each other.

Miniseries 

 La piovra 7 – Indagine sulla morte del commisario Cattani (Enquiry about superintendent Cattani’s killing) – by Luigi Perelli, with Raoul Bova (the third hero of the franchise, the vice-superintendent Gianni Breda), Patricia Millardet and Ennio Fantastichini (the new villain, Saverio Bronta), 6 episodes.

Fininvest

Variety 

 Generazione X (Generation X) – talk show about the problems of the youth, hosted by Ambra Angiolini, who here gives up the frivolous image of her beginning.
Re per una notte (1994-1996)

Births

Deaths

See also
List of Italian films of 1995

References